Goucher College is a private liberal arts college in Towson, Maryland. It was originally established in 1885 as a women's college and became coeducational in 1986.

The following is an incomplete list of prominent Goucher people.

Notable alumni

Law, government, and public affairs 

Sally Brice-O'Hara (1974), Vice Admiral and Vice Commandant of the United States Coast Guard
Joan Claybrook (1959), president of Public Citizen, think tank founded by Ralph Nader
Rita C. Davidson (1948), first woman on the Maryland Court of Appeals
Ellen Lipton Hollander (1971), federal judge for the United States District Court for the District of Maryland
Sarah T. Hughes (1917), federal judge who administered the presidential oath of office to Lyndon B. Johnson following the assassination of John F. Kennedy
Margaret G. Kibben, Rear Admiral, U.S. Navy (ret.), Chaplain of the United States House of Representatives, Chaplain of the United States Marine Corps
Phyllis A. Kravitch (1941), federal judge for the U.S. Court of Appeals for the Eleventh Circuit
Laurie McKinnon, (1982) Associate Justice of the Montana Supreme Court
John A. Olszewski, Jr. (2004), Baltimore County Executive
Kevin B. Quinn (2001), Chief Executive Officer and Administrator of the Maryland Transit Administration
A. Margaret Russanowska (1912), social worker, US Department of Labor, film censor, Red Cross worker
Jessie Woodrow Wilson Sayre (1908), daughter of U.S. President Woodrow Wilson and political activist
Paula Stern (1967), former chairwoman of the United States International Trade Commission
Lucé Vela (1982), former First Lady of Puerto Rico

Literature and journalism 

Ellen Bass (1968), poet
Emily Newell Blair, writer, feminist, and co-founder of the League of Women Voters
Sheri Booker author and poet
Andrew Ervin (1993), novelist and critic
Margaret Fishback (1921), author and poet
Jonah Goldberg (1991), author and conservative commentator
Anne Lamott (attended for two years), memoirist
Laura Amy Schlitz (1977), author, Newbery Medal and Newbery Honor winner
Darcey Steinke (1985), author and university lecturer
Eleanor Wilner (1959), poet, 1991 MacArthur Fellow

Scientists, physicians, psychologists, mathematicians, and researchers 

Beatrice Aitchison (1928), mathematician and transportation economist
Hattie Alexander (1923), pediatrician and microbiologist
Anne Bahlke (1926), physician, medical research, state public health official
Ruth Bleier (1945), neurophysiologist, feminist scholar
Teresa Cohen (1912), mathematician
Nan Dieter-Conklin (1948), radio astronomer
Helen Dodson Price (1927), astronomer, winner of the Annie J. Cannon Award in Astronomy
Margaret Irving Handy (1911), pediatrician
Helen C. Harrison (1931), winner of the John Howland Award and the E. Mead Johnson Award for work in pediatrics
Ethel Browne Harvey, embryologist
Marjorie G. Horning, biochemist and pharmacologist
Georgeanna Seegar Jones (1932), reproductive endocrinologist
Kate Breckenridge Karpeles (1909), United States Army doctor during World War I
Harriet H. Malitson (1948), astronomer at Goddard Space Flight Center
Grace Manson, psychologist
Margaret McFarland (1927), psychologist and consultant to Mister Rogers' Neighborhood
Florence Marie Mears (1917), mathematician
Bessie Moses (1915), gynecologist and obstetrician
Florence B. Seibert (1918), biochemist
Lydia Villa-Komaroff, molecular biologist
Jean Worthley (1944), naturalist

Academics and scholars 
Elizabeth Nesbitt (1897 – 1977),  children's librarian and a library science educator
Shirley Montag Almon (1956), economist
Constance Prem Nath Dass (1911), first Indian president of Isabella Thoburn College
Alice Deal (1899) first female school principal in the District of Columbia
Karen S. Haynes (1968), president of California State University, San Marcos
Alice Kessler-Harris (1961), historian and professor
Amy Hewes (1897), Economist and professor at Mount Holyoke College
Stephen Kimber, Canadian journalist and professor at University of King's College
Joan Maling, linguist and professor
Nancy Mowll Mathews (1968), art historian
Sara Haardt Mencken (1920), professor of English literature, wife of H. L. Mencken
Edith Philips (1913), educator and writer, 1928 Guggenheim Fellow
Hortense Powdermaker (1919), anthropologist
Elizabeth Barrows Ussher, Christian missionary and witness to the Armenian genocide
Anna Crone, linguist and literary theorist

Arts and entertainment 

Nan Agle, children's books author
Clara Beranger (1907), screenwriter, married to William C. DeMille
Mildred Dunnock (1922), Oscar-nominated film and stage actress
Alison Fanelli (2001), actress starring as Ellen on The Adventures of Pete & Pete
Dustin Hodge, producer and writer
Jesse J. Holland (2012), journalist, author, and guest host on C-SPAN's Washington Journal.
Anne Hummert (née. Schumacher) (1925), creator of leading radio soap operas during the 1930s and '40s
Christine Jowers (1985), choreographer, producer, and dance critic
Nancy Koenigsberg (B.A. degree 1949), American sculptor and textile artist
Jane Levy (attended for a semester), actress
Selma L. Oppenheimer, Baltimore-based artist
Mary Vivian Pearce, actress who worked with film director John Waters, considered one of the Dreamlanders
Gabby Rivera (2004), author of fiction and graphic novels.
Ruddy Roye (1998), documentary photographer and Time magazine's pick for Instagram Photographer of 2016
Rosalind Solomon (1951), artist and photographer

Business 

Katherine August-deWilde, former president of First Republic Bank from 2007 to 2015 and current vice chair
Sally Buck, partial owner of the Major League Baseball team Philadelphia Phillies
Sherry Cooper (1972), former chief economist at BMO Financial Group
Olive Dennis (1908), civil engineer for B&O Railroad, first female member of the American Railway Engineering and Maintenance-of-Way Association
Bradford Shellhammer (1998), eBay executive, co-founder of Fab.com, Bezar, and Queerty
Elsie Shutt, one of the first women to start a software company in the United States

Sports 

Susan Devlin (1953), American-Irish badminton champion
Judy Devlin Hashman (1958), ten-time All-England badminton singles champion
Matthew Forgues, racewalker
Emily Kagan, American mixed martial artist

Notable faculty 

Vasily Aksyonov, Soviet-Russian novelist
Flo Ayres, radio actress
Kaushik Bagchi, Indian historian
Jean H. Baker, historian
Robert M. Beachy, historian
Dorothy Lewis Bernstein, mathematician
Chrystelle Trump Bond, dancer, choreographer and dance historian
Alice Braunlich, classical philologist
Neil H. Buchanan, economist and legal scholar
George Delahunty, physiologist and endocrinologist
Rhoda Dorsey, historian
Janet Dudley-Eshbach, academic administrator
Andrew Ervin, author, critic and, editor
Harriet Campbell Foss, painter
Thomas French, journalist
Marianne Githens, political scientist, author, and feminist
Margret Grebowicz, Polish philosopher, author, and jazz vocalist
Pamela Haag author, historian
Mildred Harnack, American-German historian, translator, and German Resistance fighter in Nazi Germany
Elaine Ryan Hedges, writer and feminist
Clark S. Hobbs, Vice President 
Dustin Hodge, producer and writer
Jesse J. Holland, journalist and author 
Ailish Hopper, poet, writer, and teacher
Nancy Hubbard, author and public relations consultant
Harry Mortimer Hubbell, classicist
Julie Roy Jeffrey, historian
Nina Kasniunas, political scientist and writer
Elaine Koppelman, mathematician
Florence Lewis, mathematician and astronomer
Robert Hall Lewis, composer
Laura Lippman, author
Oliver W. F. Lodge, British author and poet
William Harding Longley, botanist
Suzannah Lessard, author
Nina Marković, Croatian-American physicist
Elizabeth Stoffregen May, economist and women's education advocate
Howard Norman, writer and educator
Edith Philips, writer and French literary academic
Richard Pringle, psychologist
Victor Ricciardi, professor of business and author
Alice S. Rossi, sociologist and feminist
Mike Sager, journalist and author
Forrest Shreve, botanist
Martha Siegel, mathematician and educator
Robert Slocum, botanist and biologist
Eleanor Patterson Spencer, art historian
Elizabeth Spires, poet
Dorothy Stimson, historian of science
Shira Tarrant, writer
Ruth Dogget Terzaghi, geologist
Bill Thomas, journalist
Michelle Tokarczyk, author, poet, and literary critic
Meline Toumani author and journalist
Sanford J. Ungar, journalist and academic administrator
Robert S. Welch, academic administrator
Juliette Wells, author and editor
Lilian Welsh, physician, educator, suffragist, and advocate for women's health
Mary Wilhelmine Williams, historian
Ola Elizabeth Winslow, historian, biographer, and educator
Jill Zimmerman, computer scientist
Mary Kay Zuravleff, writer and novelist
David Zurawik, journalist, author, and media critic

Presidents 
Since its founding, Goucher has had a total of 18 presidents, five of whom were acting. The college's longest-serving president was Rhoda Dorsey, who held the position for 20 years.

Color key

References 

Goucher College people
Goucher College people